The Sun Kudumbam Viruthugal 2010 were given for 22 categories, of which there were 8 main awards, 8 performance awards and 6 technical awards. The nominations and victories were based on votes via text messaging. The award ceremony was hosted by  actress Kasthuri and Rishi. Special guests who attended the function include Sneha, Gautham Vasudev Menon, Ramesh Khanna, Lawrence Raghavendra, Solomon Pappaiah, Sathyan, Arun Vijay, Manobala and Kaveri Maran, wife of Kalanidhi Maran. The ceremony was held at the Nandambakkam Trade Centre on 11 April 2010 and was televised in India by Sun TV on 2 May 2010.

Thirumathi Selvam won 10 awards including Best Serial and Best Director for Kumaran. Other winners were Arasi and Kolangal with five awards, Thangam with three awards, and Sivasakthi and Metti Oli with one.

Nominees and winners

Main awards 
Winners are listed first and highlighted in boldface.

Performance Awards

Technical Awards

See also 
 Sun Kudumbam Viruthugal
 Vijay Television Awards
 Zee Tamil Kudumbam Viruthugal

References 

Tamil-language television awards
Sun Kudumbam Viruthugal